In American football, the starting quarterback is typically viewed as the leader of a team. The quarterback is considered the most important position on the field and among the most important positions in team sports. They are among the most high-profile athletes in North America and have been described as akin to A-list celebrities. The success of a National Football League (NFL) franchise often rests on the quarterback; thus, teams will go to great lengths to find a franchise quarterback to build around for the long term goals of the team.

List
Note: The players listed here are the starting quarterbacks of each team's  (Week 18 of the 2022 NFL season) and may not reflect roster changes made since that time. Because of this, quarterbacks that have been announced as replacement due to injury or otherwise should not be included until they make their start.

See also
List of most consecutive starts by a National Football League quarterback
List of National Football League career quarterback wins leaders

References

Starting